Mantidactylus lugubris is a frog species in the family Mantellidae. It is endemic to Madagascar.

Its natural habitats are subtropical or tropical moist lowland forests, subtropical or tropical moist montane forests, moist savanna, subtropical or tropical high-altitude grassland, rivers, and heavily degraded former forest. It is not considered threatened by the IUCN.

References

 

lugubris
Endemic frogs of Madagascar
Taxonomy articles created by Polbot
Amphibians described in 1853
Taxa named by André Marie Constant Duméril